Kertomesis thyrota is a moth in the family Autostichidae. It was described by Edward Meyrick in 1929. It is found in Sudan.

The wingspan is about 14 mm. The forewings are pale ochreous with blackish markings. There is a suboval spot on the base of the costa, a subbasal dot almost on the dorsum, a dot representing the first discal stigma, a short inwards-oblique streak from the costa at two-thirds, an erect fasciate streak from the dorsum towards the tornus reaching two-thirds of the way across the wing, and three or four marginal dots around the apex. The hindwings are light grey.

References

Moths described in 1929
Kertomesis
Taxa named by Edward Meyrick